The 1990–91 Sheffield Shield season was the 89th season of the Sheffield Shield, the domestic first-class cricket competition of Australia. Victoria won the championship.

Table

Final

Statistics

Most Runs
Stuart Law 1082

Most Wickets
Paul Reiffel 49

References

Sheffield Shield
Sheffield Shield
Sheffield Shield seasons